Nebulus may refer to:
 Nebulus (video game), a computer game
 Alphazone, a hard trance musical group also known as Nebulus
 "Nebulus", an electronica song by Fluke from the 2003 album Puppy

See also
Nebulous (disambiguation)
Nebula (disambiguation)